The 1999 Copeland Borough Council election took place on 6 May 1999 to elect members of Copeland Borough Council in Cumbria, England. The whole council was up for election with boundary changes since the last election in 1995. The Labour Party stayed in overall control of the council.

Election result

References

1999 English local elections
1999
1990s in Cumbria